Fox Hills may refer to:

 Fox Hills, Culver City, California
 Fox Hills, Staten Island, New York
 Fox Hills Formation, a Cretaceous geologic formation in the northwestern Great Plains of North America
 Fox Hills Mall, former name of Westfield Culver City, California
 Jabal Thuaileb (Fox Hills), a district in Al Daayen, Qatar

See also 
 Foxhills School, Scunthorpe, North Lincolnshire, England
 Fox Hill (disambiguation)
 Foxhill (disambiguation)